McGarrigle is a surname. Notable people with the surname include:

Anna McGarrigle (born 1944), Canadian folk singer-songwriter
Kate McGarrigle (1946–2010), Canadian folk singer-songwriter
Jane McGarrigle, Canadian songwriter and musician
Thomas J. McGarrigle, American politician